Morston is a village and civil parish in the English county of Norfolk.
The population remained less than 100 at the 2011 Census and was included in the civil parish of Blakeney.
For the purposes of local government, it falls within the district of North Norfolk.

The place-name 'Morston' is first attested in the Domesday Book of 1086, where it appears as Merstona. The name means 'marsh town or settlement'.

Like its neighbour Blakeney, Morston, used to be a major port 400 years ago, but is now only used by a small number of fishing boats, leisure craft and the regular seal watching trips which leave for Blakeney Point.

Morston Hall  restaurant owned by Galton Blackiston is located in the parish.

Notes about Morston
Harold Davidson (1875 – 1937),  the "Rector of Stiffkey" was also the parish priest here.

The father of writer Annie Hall Cudlip commanded the local Coastguard station.

The 1973 Derby Stakes winner was Morston, the horse being named after the village. Running for just the second time he was returned at odds of 25–1. His half-brother Blakeney won the same race in 1969.

Morston is the location of a large annual charity book sale, organised by the Friends of Morston Church.

References

External links

 Morston Photographs

Villages in Norfolk
Populated coastal places in Norfolk
Civil parishes in Norfolk
North Norfolk